Vicente Cantatore (6 October 1935 – 15 January 2021) was an Argentine football player and manager.

Career
He played for Talleres de Córdoba, Tigre, San Lorenzo, Rangers de Talca, Santiago Wanderers and Deportes Concepción.

He managed Lota Schwager, Cobreloa, Chile, Real Valladolid, Sevilla, Universidad Católica, Colo-Colo, Tenerife, Real Valladolid, Sporting CP, Betis and Sporting de Gijón.

Personal life
Born in Argentina, his parents were Italians and he naturalized Chilean.

He was the grand-uncle of former Gateway IGA fish salesman Anthony Cantatore.

References

External links
 Once-onze.narod.ru 
 Vicente Cantatore at MemoriaWanderers 

1935 births
2021 deaths
Argentine sportspeople of Italian descent
Footballers from Rosario, Santa Fe
Association football midfielders
Argentine footballers
Argentine expatriate footballers
Argentine expatriate sportspeople in Chile
Expatriate footballers in Chile
Argentine emigrants to Chile
Naturalized citizens of Chile
Chilean people of Italian descent
Chilean footballers
San Lorenzo de Almagro footballers
Club Atlético Tigre footballers
Rangers de Talca footballers
Deportes Concepción (Chile) footballers
Santiago Wanderers footballers
Argentine Primera División players
Chilean Primera División players
Chilean football managers
Chilean expatriate football managers
Argentine football managers
Argentine expatriate football managers
Lota Schwager managers
Audax Italiano managers
Cobreloa managers
Chile national football team managers
Real Valladolid managers
Sevilla FC managers
Club Deportivo Universidad Católica managers
Rosario Central managers
Colo-Colo managers
CD Tenerife managers
Sporting CP managers
Real Betis managers
Sporting de Gijón managers
Chilean Primera División managers
La Liga managers
Argentine Primera División managers
Primeira Liga managers
Segunda División managers
Expatriate football managers in Chile
Expatriate football managers in Spain
Expatriate football managers in Portugal
Chilean expatriate sportspeople in Spain
Chilean expatriate sportspeople in Portugal
Argentine expatriate sportspeople in Spain
Argentine expatriate sportspeople in Portugal